Peregrine is the sixth studio album by indie rock band The Appleseed Cast, released on March 21, 2006, on The Militia Group.

Track listing
The album had 13 tracks.
"Ceremony" – 4:17
"Woodland Hunter (Part 1)" – 3:16
"Here We Are (Family in the Hallways)" – 3:40
"Silas' Knife" – 4:08
"Mountain Halo" – 4:09
"Sunlit and Ascending" – 4:01
"February" – 3:51
"An Orange and a Blue" – 4:11
"Song 3" – 5:00
"Woodland Hunter (Part 2)" – 4:30
"Peregrine" – 4:06
"A Fate Delivered" – 3:53
"The Clock and the Storm" – 5:54
"Rendition" (Japan Bonus Track) – 4:03

References

2006 albums
The Appleseed Cast albums
Albums produced by John Congleton